Morrillito is a small uninhabited island off the southern coast of Puerto Rico. The island is protected by the Reserva Natural Caja de Muertos natural reserve because of its native turtle traffic. Together with Caja de Muertos, Gatas, Ratones, Cardona, Isla del Frio, and Isla de Jueyes, Morrillito is one of seven islands ascribed to the municipality of Ponce.

Location
It is located at latitude 17.88417 and longitude -66.53361. Page 592. Fourth Edition: 1922.</ref>

Geography and climate
The island is a small 31-foot flat-topped island located 200 yards off the southwestern tip of Caja de Muertos and, when viewed from a distance, Morrillito can easily be mistaken for the 170-ft steep hill (called Cerro Morrillo, Morrillo Hill) at the extreme southwestern portion of Caja de Muertos proper.Isla del Frio. Mapquest. Retrieved 26 April 2011. The climate is dry and the island supports a dry forest.

Natural reserve
Together with Caja de Muertos ( and Berberia Key (Morrillito makes up the Caja de Muertos Natural Reserve. The island was designated as a nature reserve in 1980 after a meeting was held in Puerto Rico by the Puerto Rico Planning Board wherein they considered the recommendation set forth by the Coastal Management Zone Program to turn the island into a protected wilderness area. The island has remained a protected area ever since. The protection is mainly due to its heavy Hawksbill sea turtle traffic which is an endangered species.

See also

 Fauna of Puerto Rico

References

External links
 See an aerial photo of flat-surfaced Morrillito (taken looking north) HERE. Source: "¡Una obra magistral Puerto Rico 365!"'' La Perla del Sur. Ponce, Puerto Rico. (Title in printed edition: "Plasma en Puerto Rico 365° las joyas del archipiélago: la publicación ofrece 224 páginas de expectaculares fotografías." Year 32. Number 1518. Page 20.) Both versions published 2 January 2013. Retrieved 3 January 2013. 
 Natural Reserve, official page
 Morrillito at Panoramio
 

Uninhabited islands of Puerto Rico
Protected areas of Puerto Rico
Islands of Ponce, Puerto Rico